The Auburn Tigers baseball team represents Auburn University in NCAA Division I college baseball. Along with most other Auburn athletic teams, the baseball team participates in the Western division of the Southeastern Conference. The Tigers play their home games on campus at Plainsman Park, and they are coached by Butch Thompson.

History
Auburn Baseball has won six SEC championships, three SEC Tournament championships, appeared in 22 NCAA Regionals, and reached the College World Series (CWS) six times.

Following the 2000 season, Hal Baird retired as a head coach.  After 16 years at head of the Auburn baseball program, Baird posted an impressive 634–328–0 overall record.

On September 1, 1999, Steve Renfroe was named head baseball coach at Auburn University, as the successor to Hal Baird following the 2000 season.  Renfroe was longtime assistant coach at Auburn before being named head coach, having begun his coaching career at Auburn in 1981 as an assistant and remaining in that position until 1995 when he was named assistant head coach.

On June 7, 2004, Renfroe was relieved of his duties as head baseball coach at Auburn. He posted an overall mark of 145–92, including a 60–60 SEC record, during his tenure. Each of Renfroe's first three Auburn squads advanced to the NCAA Baseball Tournaments, with stops in Tallahassee, FL, in 2001, Tuscaloosa, AL, in 2002, and hosting a 2003 Regional in Auburn.

On June 29, 2004, Tom Slater was named as Steve Renfroe's replacement. After only having 2 coaches in 38 years, Auburn was now on the second coach within a five-year period. Slater was previously an assistant at Auburn during the 1990s before taking a head coaching job at his alma mater Virginia Military Institute following the 2000 season. After the 2003 season, Slater left VMI to take an assistant job at the University of Florida where he helped lead the Gators to their first ever Super Regional appearance.

On June 20, 2008, John Pawlowski was introduced as the 16th Head Coach of the Auburn Tigers baseball program. Pawlowski was previously the head coach at the College of Charleston. He took over that program in 2000, and posted a 338–192–1 record during his tenure. Under his direction, the Cougars made three straight NCAA post-season appearances, including their first ever appearance in 2004. He was named the Southern Conference coach of the year in 2004, 2005, and 2007, and coached 17 All-Americans during his tenure.  At Auburn, he took over a very young baseball team that included two freshman all-American selections, Hunter Morris and Brian Fletcher.

On May 27, 2013, John Pawlowski was fired after finishing the 2013 season with a 33–23 record overall and a 13–17 record in the SEC.  The Tigers failed to reach the NCAA tournament for three straight years. Pawlowski compiled a 167–126 overall record and a 71–79 SEC mark at Auburn. His 2010 team won the SEC West, but his four other teams had losing conference records.

Stadium

Plainsman Park
Samford Stadium-Hitchcock Field at Plainsman Park is a baseball stadium located in Auburn, Alabama. It is the home field for the Auburn Tigers baseball team. Commonly known as "Plainsman Park", it is widely considered one of the finest facilities in college baseball and has a seating capacity of 4,096 not including lawn areas.

The field was named in 1997 to honor two former Auburn players, Billy and Jimmy Hitchcock.  The Hitchcock brothers were popular athletes in the 1930s.  Jimmy was Auburn's first All-American in football and baseball, and later coached the Tigers during the 1940s.  Billy helped Auburn make its first bowl appearance in football, as well as, helping the Tigers claim their first SEC baseball title in 1937.  He later became a manager in the MLB.

In 2003, the stadium was renamed Samford Stadium-Hitchcock Field at Plainsman Park after W. James "Jimmy" Samford passed.  Samford was a graduate of Auburn, a former board of trustees member, and was known for pushing the renovations of the stadium that began in 1996.

Head coaches
 Records are through the 2022 Season

Year-by-year results

*Final rankings are from Collegiate Baseball Division I Final Polls (1959–2006)
*Auburn baseball history year-by-year results

Auburn Tigers in the NCAA tournament
Since the NCAA Division I baseball tournament began in 1947, the Auburn Tigers have played in it 22 times and made it to the College World Series six times.

Auburn's first-team All-Americans

Player awards

National awards
 Rotary Smith Award
Tim Hudson (1997)
 Collegiate Baseball Freshman of the Year Award
Hayden Gliemmo (1998)
Pat Duke (1958)
 Auburn 1st All-American

SEC Awards
 Player of the Year Award
Tim Hudson (1997)
Hunter Morris (2010)
 Freshman of the Year Award
Hunter Morris (2008)

Coaches awards

SEC Awards
 SEC Coach of the Year
Dell Morgan (1937)
Joe Connally (1958)
Paul Nix (1963, 1967, 1976, 1978)

References

External links